

Explorations

Excavations
 Start of 5-year project of large excavations at Birka (Sweden).
 Start of 5-year project of excavation and restoration at the Ruins of Saint Paul's, Macau.
 Start of long-term project of large excavations at Sagalassos (Turkey) by Marc Waelkens.
 Work begins at Leptiminus (Tunisia) by David Mattingly.
 Survey and excavation at Tall el-Hammam.
 Vijayanagara research project begins in India.

Finds
 March – Swash Channel Wreck, a continental European armed merchantman of the  early 17th century, is found off the south coast of England.
 October – Wonoboyo Hoard of gold and silver artifacts from the 9th century Mataram Kingdom in Central Java.
 December 13 – West Runton Mammoth partially uncovered in England.
 Vũng Tàu shipwreck, a lorcha (boat) of about 1690 carrying a cargo of porcelain, is identified in the South China Sea (in the Côn Đảo archipelago).
 Workers' tombs in Giza pyramid complex of Egypt.
 "Ossuary of Caiaphas" in Jerusalem.
 A road-building crew in Central China accidentally uncovers a Han dynasty vault, containing perhaps tens of thousands of terra-cotta figures.

Publications
 Sylvia P. Beamon and Susan Roaf – The Ice-houses of Britain.

Events
 November – British Government produces Planning Policy Guidance 16: Archaeology and Planning to advise local authorities on the treatment of archaeology within the planning process. Site developers are required to contract with archaeological teams to have sites investigated in advance of development.

Births

Deaths
 January 29 – Leslie Peter Wenham, English Roman archaeologist (born 1911)

See also
 Pompeii

References

Archaeology
Archaeology by year
Archaeology